The Bandy World Championship 2010 was held between 24 and 31 January 2010, in Moscow, Russia. Men's teams from 11 countries participated in the 2010 competition: Finland, Kazakhstan, Norway, Russia, Sweden, the United States (group A) and Canada, Hungary, Latvia, Mongolia and the Netherlands (group B).

The tournament was won by Sweden, beating Russia with 6–5 after sudden death. The standing was 5–5 after full-time and the match winning goal was conceived by Daniel Mossberg, scoring in the 110th minute. This was Sweden's tenth Championship victory in this the XXIXth Bandy World Championship. Russia won silver medals and Finland won bronze medals.

All matches were played in the indoor venue Ice Palace Krylatskoye in Moscow, Russia.

Participating teams

Division A

Division B 

Belarus had qualified for play in this year's Division A during the 2009 Bandy World Championship, but since they did not take part in 2010, the USA, which had lost the qualifier to Belarus in 2009, was promoted to Division A instead.

Squads

Venues

Division A

Preliminary round

Knockout stage

Semi-finals

Third place play-off

Final

Division B

Preliminary round

Knockout stage

Fourth place play-off

Second place play-off

Relegation playoffs 
The team that finished last in Division A, the United States, and the winner in Division B, Canada, met in a qualifying match for the vacant seat in next year's WC Division A. The match was won by 9–6 by the USA, thus secured another year in Division A.

References

Sources
 Official website 

World Championship
2010 in Russian sport
2010
World Championship,2010
Sports competitions in Moscow
January 2010 sports events in Russia